Sadou Soloké is the Governor of the Agadez Region, Niger.

Political positions
Soloké has stated that the government supports reopening the Djado Plateau for gold mining, with additional regulations.

References

Living people
Nigerien politicians
Year of birth missing (living people)